László Szőgyény-Marich de Magyar-Szőgyén et Szolgaegyháza (2 January 1806 – 19 November 1893) was a Hungarian politician, who served as Speaker of the House of Magnates between 1883 and 1884. He also functioned as Imperial and Royal Chamberlain, Privy Councillor, Knight of the Golden Fleece, board member of the Hungarian Academy of Sciences, Master of the Treasury (1884–1888) and Lord Chief Justice (1888–1893).

His son was Count László Szőgyény-Marich Jr., an Austro-Hungarian diplomat, ambassador, Minister besides the King of Hungary.

Biography
He was born as László Szőgyény de Magyar-Szőgyén into a noble family, son of Vice Chancellor Zsigmond Szőgyény and Júlia Pászthory. He started his studies at Theresianum in Vienna then attended Faculty of Humanities and Law at University of Pest. He was awarded doctor of philosophy at the age of 18. He became honorary deputy recorder, then recorder of Pest County. From 1844 he served as Councillor in the Hungarian Royal Court Chancellery. He was appointed Court Chancellor but resigned from this position during the Hungarian Revolution of 1848 when the chancellery was dissolved. He became a National Guard but did not fight in battles.

He was a member of the Imperial Council in 1851 where he sought to restore the old Hungarian constitution. He served as Vice Chairman of the Council in 1859. On 20 October 1860, when the Court Chancellery restored, he was appointed Vice Chancellor. He resigned after dissolution of the Diet in 1861.

Szőgyény-Marich served as board member of the Hungarian Academy of Sciences since 1855. He was appointed Lord Lieutenant (Count; comes) of Fejér County in 1865. He held this position until 1883. He became a member of the House of Magnates. He was appointed Speaker of the Upper House, when his predecessor, György Majláth was murdered in March 1883. He retired from the politics in 1885.

Family
He married Mária Marich de Szolgaegyháza, the only daughter of István Dávid Marich de Szolgaegyháza and Baroness Franciska Kray de Topolya. As only descendant of the Marich family she could inherit. László Szőgyény was authorized by King Francis Joseph to adopt his wife's surname. Name and coat-of-arms of the two families were united.

They had eight children, the eldest one was László. Their other son, Géza served as Member of Parliament and Master of Treasury.

References
 Jónás, Károly – Villám, Judit: A Magyar Országgyűlés elnökei 1848-2002. Argumentum, Budapest, 2002. pp. 209–212

1806 births
1893 deaths
Speakers of the House of Magnates
Judges royal
Masters of the treasury (Kingdom of Hungary)
Members of the Hungarian Academy of Sciences
Knights of the Golden Fleece